Etiquette in Latin America varies by country and by region within a given country.

Generalizations

There are several definitions of Latin America, but all of them define a huge expanse of geography with an incalculable amount of different customs. However, some generalizations can be made:

 Compared to much of the English-speaking world, people from areas of Latin America may demonstrate more relaxed and casual behaviour and be more comfortable with loud talk, exaggerated gestures and physical contact. It is common to greet known people by kissing him/her on the cheek.
 In addition, many Latin American people have a smaller sense of personal space than people from English-speaking cultures. It may be rude to step away from someone when they are stepping closer.
 At some finer restaurants, it may be considered rude for the staff to bring a customer the check without the customer first requesting it.
 It is considered impolite to "toss" objects to people instead of directly handing it to them.
 The American "come here" gesture of palm upwards with the fingers curled back can be considered a romantic solicitation.

Specific regions
The following points of etiquette apply most specifically to a certain region:

Brazil

 Brazilians speak Portuguese, not Spanish. Addressing someone who speaks Portuguese in Spanish, although most Brazilians understand Spanish to a reasonable degree, may be considered very offensive.
 In Brazil, a form of the American "ok" gesture is obscene when directed at someone with the symbol upside down (back of hands down, circle forward to someone, rest of fingers to your self pointing any side), implying something like "go f... yourself!". However, the standard "okay" gesture is also used, as is the "thumbs up" gesture.
 The gesture of "flipping someone off" by hitting the wrist against the inside of the elbow (sometimes called "a banana" in Brazil) is considered playful and not very offensive (in some other parts of the world, this is more akin to "the finger").
 Giving someone of the opposite gender a gift may be easily misinterpreted as a romantic overture, except for birthdays.
 In some parts of the country, most notably in rural or suburban areas in which homes may not have doorbells, the appropriate action is to stand in the yard and clap one's hands. If no one comes to the door, then the visitor may approach the door, knock, and then step back away from the door and await a response. This is especially applicable in regards to small, thin-walled cottages that offer less privacy than homes in North America.
 In the northeast of the country is rude to enter the house with your shoes in, you have to take them off.
 In the northeast region and rural areas is rude don't ask for blessing from parents and family, so is common to see kids and adults asking: "Abenção?" or "Bença (informal use)" and they parents answer with "Deus te abençoe (God may bless you)" if they don't that probably will be seen with bad eyes.
 Tip isn't a thing in Brazil.
 Kids are not allowed to talk in adult conversation, if they do their parents will give them a lesson later.
 Brush your teeth 3 or 2 times in a day, when you wake up, lunch and dinner (Even in college, work, and school; Everybody does that). 
 Take shower every day, because of the weather.
 Use napkins when touching your food.
 In the bathroom don't put the paper in the toilet, put it in the bin.  
 Don't put salt in the avocado, put sugar.
 Give people normal temperature beer is like a crime, the beer has to be super cold. 
 Give a sip (Of vodka or beer) for the saint, the saint is the orisha Exu, which is worshiped in Brazilian afro-indigenous religions, like Candoblé and Umbanda.
 Jump seven waves and wearing white in the new year, this comes from Brazilians afro-indigenous religions, the reason is to be grateful and wishes good things for the new year, so people will use the color of what they want in the new year (it goes like White-Peace, Red-Love, Yellow-Monet). Jump the seven waves and sometimes make a wish in every wave and be grateful for Iemanjá (Orisha worshiped in Brazil) to leave the bad things in the past year.
 Make 3 wishes in the lord of Bonfim bracelet and gives 3 knots, so the wish can come true. The Senhor do Bonfim Ribbon has a side that few people know: each color symbolizes an Orisha. Is used in the northeast of the country and people really believe in that, so please don't disrespect the beliefs.
 Tan is actually sexy in Brazil, so people use insulating tape to keep a tan in cities like Rio or São Paulo. It is common to see people discoloring the hair on the legs and arms on the beach, it is also common to get Renna tattoos on the beach.
 Usually people who are dating sit beside each other and nobody really cares when they show love at the table.
 Use a fork and knife to eat pizza.
 Avoid talking about politics and religion.
 It is extremely rude to point at someone in the street or out in public.
 When you meet someone it is common to give 2 kisses on the cheek, it is accepted that males can only do this to females and not to other men.
 Handshake is seen to be formal, usually used in the workplace only.
 Holding hands and kisses in the street isn't seen as rude, it is common see couples (LGBTQ+ couples too, but only in high public places (like in the beach, malls, etc), if you do that near churches it may be dangerous and become a problem to many Brazilian people) share affection in public, people don't care at all.
 At restaurants, usually everyone who eats pays the bill. Commonly splitting it among people (including dates.)

Haiti
 Although tied more closely to France than to Spain or Portugal, the etiquette regarding Haiti is similar to other Latin American countries.
 Haitians take proper behavior seriously and this includes good manners, clean appearances at all times, a moderate tone in one's speech, and avoidance of any profanity or public "scenes", as these are all important indicators of one's social class.
 Entering a household and not greeting the elders or owners of the household is regarded as highly offensive. Say bonjou (good morning) or bonswa (good afternoon) when entering a room or passing by someone on the street.
 Eating is considered a social event and so withdrawing from the center of activities during meals is considered slightly offensive.
 At restaurants, the one who extended the invitation pays the bill. Unless another woman is present, a woman should not buy dinner for a man. Making arrangements for payment before the meal is considered especially polite. When summoning a server, make eye contact; waving or calling their names is very impolite.
 At the dining table, the European etiquette applies; ladies sit first, fork on the left, elbows off the table, etc. When utensils are not being used, a person's hands are expected to be visible above the table resting the wrists on top of the table and not at one's lap. Diners are expected to stay at the table for the entire meal; no bathroom breaks.
 While dining, for making a toast, the most common toast is sante (to your health). When beginning to eat wait until after the host says "bon appetit!" ("enjoy your meal!").
 Relationships are important to Haitians, so business discussions should be saved until the end of the meal, or for later.
 Avoid discussing politics, corruptions within the government, and Dominican life, without having a good understanding of the issues as well as the people with whom one is discussing it, and until one has established a relationship with the listener. These are touchy subjects to speak about, especially if one does not know what one is talking about.
 The infamous Haitian Creole phrase Langyèt Maman'w is highly offensive, insulting one's mother. Uttering this to someone will almost certainly provoke conflict.
 It is rude to point at someone.
 Haitians expect to barter when making a purchase.
 Men shake hands on meeting and departing. Men and women kiss on the cheek when greeting. Women kiss each other on the cheek.  Friends, family and close acquaintances usually share a light kiss on the cheek.
 When attending church (whether it be Roman Catholic or Protestant), one's best formal shoes and clothes are to be worn.
 Punctuality in an informal setting is not highly valued and being late is usually not considered rude.
 People holding hands is an ordinary display of friendship though women and men, but seldom show public affection toward the opposite sex but are affectionate in private. It is also common for people of the same sexes to hold hands, and is often mistakenly viewed as homosexuality to outsiders.
 Children are to be seen and not heard; not to draw attention to one's self.
 It is especially disrespectful for children to whistle, point, suck their teeth, stare, or to roll their eyes at adults. Children should also avoid sitting with their legs crossed and acting like an adult.
 Flatulence, when company is present, is very rude and should be done in another unoccupied place. It is polite to say "excusez-moi", which means "excuse me".

See also
 Etiquette
 Etiquette in Africa
 Etiquette in Asia
 Etiquette in Australia and New Zealand
 Etiquette in Canada and the United States
 Etiquette in Europe
 Etiquette in the Middle East

References

Latin America
Latin American culture